Center for Informal Learning and Schools (CILS) is an American-based National Science Foundation funded center to create a program of research, scholarship, and leadership in the arena of informal learning and the relationship of informal science institutions and schools. The center was founded in 2002.

Functionality
Like all NSF-funded Centers for Learning and Teaching, CILS addresses "pressing problems confronting K-12 science education" by focusing on some key component of the national science education infrastructure.

In particular, CILS is concerned with making K-12 science education more compelling and accessible to a diverse student population, including students who come from families with little formal experience with K-12 schools and science learning. CILS does this through studying science learning in out-of-school settings, including informal science institutions, and building programmatic bridges between out-of-school and school science learning. In tandem with these studies, CILS seeks to build on and strengthen modes and methods of engagement and conceptual development commonly found in those settings.

National Science Foundation